The Council of Senior Scholars (Hay'at Kibar al-‘Ulama - هيئة كبار العلماء, also known as the Senior Council of Ulama) is the Kingdom of Saudi Arabia's highest religious body, and  advises the king on religious matters. The council is appointed by the king, with salaries paid by the government. As of 2009, the council was made up of 21 members.  Saudi King Fahd continued the precedent set by earlier kings of meeting weekly with Council members who resided in the capital, Riyadh.  In 2010, Saudi King Abdullah decreed that only members of the Council and a few other Islamic Scholars could issue fatwa in Saudi Arabia.

History
Prior to 1971, the council met informally, headed by the Grand Mufti.

On 29 August 1972 King Faisal ibn Abd al-Aziz issued a royal decree establishing the Council.

Until 2009, the body was restricted to members of the Hanbali madhab (school of Islamic jurisprudence). On 14 February of that year King Abdullah expanded the Committee to include scholars from the other three Sunni schools of Islamic jurisprudence (Shafi'i, Hanafi and Maliki). Despite the newfound diversity, observers note that the scholars continue to hold very similar positions in regard to ʿAqīdah (creed).

As of 2022, the Grand Mufti, Sheikh Abdulaziz al-Sheikh, is still the head of the council.

Fatawa
The Senior Council assists in reviewing requests for fatwas prepared by the four (or five) member Permanent Committee for Islamic Research and Issuing Fatwas whose membership is drawn from the Senior Council. The members of the Senior Council are appointed to four year terms.  In 2010, Saudi King Abdullah decreed that only officially approved religious scholars would be allowed to issue fatwas in Saudi Arabia, primarily the members the Council of Senior Scholars. At least one Islamic fatwa website Islam-QA run by Saudi Islamic scholar Muhammad Al-Munajid was banned in Saudi Arabia as a result.

The Senior Council and the Permanent Committee issue fatwas, the imams communicate them, and the Committee for the Promotion of Virtue and the Prevention of Vice enforces their rulings.

Ulama
While the ulema of Saudi Arabia and the Council are sometimes used interchangeably (for example here), in fact, of the estimated 7,000 to 10,000 people that made up the ulama and their families in the 90s and which might have reached 20,000 in 2011 as per Sherifa Zuhur, only thirty to forty of the most senior scholars "exercised substantive political influence".

Oversight
According to Simon Henderson, the council must give a fatwa of approval before a new king is crowned. Although, as is evident by the crowning of King Salman and Crown Prince Mohammed Bin Salman the idea that the Ulema hold power over the royal family is lacking in evidence.
According to the Columbia World Dictionary of Islamism, the council serves in theory to guide the Saudi king and to verify his  "fidelity" to the Islamic principle of "absolute obedience" to Islamic law upon which "the absolute authority of the sovereign" over the Saudi population rests.  However, in practice the council "virtually never expresses opposition to any proposal from the royal family".

Support for monarchy
The Council is often used to provide religious support for government edicts. For example, in 2011 it issued a fatwa ruling against protest demonstrations calling them "deviant intellectual and partisan connections". Demonstrations "and anything that leads to disunity and fragmentation of the nation" were not allowed under Sharia (Islamic law). Reform could only come from giving advice and counsel, "and not by issuing and collecting signatures on intimidating and incendiary statements that violate what God the most High has commanded"  (sura 4, aya 83, of the Koran were cited in support).

It is rarely in opposition to government policy, and when it does disagree, the Council generally expresses it by silence.  Observers differ as to how much influence the Council has.  Many believe the government generally consults the Council prior to issuing legislation, while other believe that "more often than not", the government does "as it likes and then seeks approval after the fact". According to Christopher Boucek, the influence of the Council and ulema in general varies according to how "secure" the royal family feels. Great levels of royal confidence lead to less disregard shown to, and greater control over the religious establishment.  Unlike other ulema, Saudi scholars do not have income-generating lands or endowments to fund them and are dependent on government salaries.

In 1992 King Fahd pressured seven members of the Senior Ulema into retirement after they failed to sign a letter condemning conservative attacks on the al-Saud family. In 2009, another member—Sheikh Saad bin Nasser al-Shithri—was pressured to resign after he opposed gender mixing at the new King Abdullah University of Science and Technology, the first co-ed university in the Kingdom.

See also
College of Cardinals
Islam in Saudi Arabia
Wahhabi movement
Assembly of Experts, a council of Islamic theologians

References

External links
 General Presidency of Scholarly Research and Ifta' (Fatawa of Council of Senior Scholars), retrieved 9 March 2014

1971 establishments in Saudi Arabia
Government agencies established in 1971
Islamic organisations based in Saudi Arabia
Fatwas
Government agencies of Saudi Arabia